Murderers Among Us: The Simon Wiesenthal Story is a 1989 American biographical film directed by Brian Gibson and written by Abby Mann, Robin Vote and Ron Hutchinson. The film stars Ben Kingsley, Renée Soutendijk, Craig T. Nelson, Anton Lesser, Jack Shepherd and Paul Freeman. The film premiered on HBO on April 23, 1989.

Plot
The film is based on Wiesenthal's book of the same name that was published in 1967.

As Austrian Jews living in Ukraine at the beginning of World War II, Simon Wiesenthal and his family are captured by Nazis and sent to live in a series of prison camps, where Wiesenthal cheats death several times. When he is liberated from Mauthausen in 1945, Wiesenthal provides vital information to the Americans in the Nuremberg War Trials and dedicates his life to hunting down Nazi war criminals, even though doing so comes at a cost to his family.

Awards and nominations
 41st Primetime Emmy Awards, Los Angeles: Outstanding Writing in a Miniseries or a Special, 1989
 CableACE Award: Best Movie or Miniseries, 1990
 Funke Mediengruppe, Germany: Golden Camera Award for Best International Actor, Ben Kingsley, 1990
 5th TCA Awards, Los Angeles: Nominee: Program of the Year, 1989
 CableACE Award: Nominee: Best Actress in a Movie or Miniseries, Renée Soutendijk 1990
 CableACE Award: Nominee: Best Actor in a Miniseries or a Special, Ben Kingsley, 1990
 41st Primetime Emmy Awards, Los Angeles: Nominee: Outstanding Drama or Comedy Special, 1989
 41st Primetime Emmy Awards, Los Angeles: Nominee: Outstanding Lead Actor in a Miniseries or a Special, Ben Kingsley, 1989
 47th Golden Globe Awards, Los Angeles: Nominee: Best Performance by an Actor in a Miniseries or Motion Picture Made for Television, Ben Kinglsey, 1990

Cast 
Ben Kingsley as Simon Wiesenthal
Renée Soutendijk as Cyla
Craig T. Nelson as Major Bill Harcourt
Anton Lesser as Karl
Jack Shepherd as Brodi
Paul Freeman as Josef
David Threlfall as Alex
Louisa Milwood-Haigh as Paulina
Robert Morelli as Reed
Sándor Téri as Hauptmann

References

MUSIC
Composer by Bill Conti
Music by Harry Rabin

External links

MUSIC

1989 television films
1989 films
1980s English-language films
1989 drama films
HBO Films films
Films directed by Brian Gibson
Simon Wiesenthal
Films produced by John Kemeny
Television shows produced by Television South (TVS)
English-language television shows
Films about Nazi hunters
Films about the aftermath of the Holocaust
Films set in Austria
Films set in West Germany
American drama television films
1980s American films